Railway stations in Kenya include:

Maps 
 UN Map 
 UNHCR Atlas Map 
 Prondis Map
 Railway Gazette International June 2012, p31
 KRC Map

Towns served by metre gauge railways 

 Mombasa - ocean port
 Changamwe
 Miritini
 Mazeras
 Mariakani
 Maji ya Chumvi
 Samburu
 Taru
 Mackinnon Road
 Mwanatibu
 Buchuma
 Wangala
 Maungu
 Ndara
 Voi - junction
 Mwatate
 Bura
 Mashoti
 Maktau
 Murka
 Ziwani
 Taveta - across Tanzania border from Moshi
 Irima
 Ndi
 Manyani
 Tsavo
 Kyulu
 Kenani
 Kanga
 Mtito Andei
 Kathekani
 Darajani
 Ngwata
 Masongaleni
 Kikumbulyu
 Kibwezi
 Mbuinzau
 Makindu
 Ikoyo
 Kiboko
 Simba
 Kabati
 Emali
 Nzai
 Sultan Hamud
 Kima
 Kalembwani
 Kiu
 Ulu
 Konza - junction for Magadi
 Kajiado
 Kenya Marble Quarry
 Elangata Wuas
 Singiraini
 Koora
 Magadi - soda factory, operated by Magadi Soda Company
 Kapiti Plains Estate
 Stony Athi
 Lukenya
 Athi River (Mavoko)
 Marimbeti
 Embakasi
 Makadara
 Makongeni
 Nairobi - national capital and junction for Nanyuki
 Dandora
 Githurai
 Kahawa
 Ruiru
 Kalimoni (Juja)
 Komo
 Thika
 Mitubiri
 Santamor
 Makuyu
 Saba Saba
 Maragua
 Murang'a
 Sagana
 Makaungu
 Karatina
 Nyeri
 Naro Moru
 Nanyuki - branch terminus
 Kibera
 Dagoretti
 Kikuyu
 Muguga
 Limuru
 Uplands (Lari)
 Matathia
 Kijabe
 Longonot
 Suswa
 Munyu
 Naivasha
 Morendat
 Ilkek
 Gilgil - junction for Nyahururu
 Oleolondo
 Ol Kalou
 Nyahururu - branch terminus
 Kariandusi
 Mbaruk
 Lanet
 Nakuru

 Menengai
 Rongai
 Visoi
 Esageri
 Sabatia
 Maji Mazuri
 Makutano
 Equator
 Timboroa
 Ainakboi
 Tumeiyo
 Kipkabus
 Kaptagat
 Cheploske
 Plateau
 Sosian
 Eldoret - junction for Kitale
 Soy
 Springfield Halt
 Moi's Bridge
 Kitale - branch terminus
 Leseru
 Turbo
 Kipkarren
 Lugari
 Webuye
 Mulukbu
 Bungoma
 Mateka
 Myanga
 Kimaeti
  Malaba, Kenya
  
  Malaba, Uganda
  Tororo, Uganda

 Rongai proposed junction for Sudan; junction for Solai
 Kampi ya Moto
 Olabanaita
 Solai - branch terminus

Branches 

 Nakuru - junction for Kisumu
 Njoro
 Elburgon
 Turi
 Molo
 Mau Summit
 Londiani
 Kedowa
 Lumbwa
 Kipkelion
 Tunnel
 Fort Ternan
 Koru
 Muhoroni
 Chemelil
 Kibigori
 Miwani
 Kibos
 Kisumu - inland port on Lake Victoria
 Kisian
 Lela
 Maseno
 Luanda
 Yala
 Namasoli
 Butere - branch terminus

Towns served by Standard Gauge Railway 

 Mombasa
 Mariakani
 Voi
 Miasenyi
 Mtito Andei
 Kibwezi
 Emali
 Athi River
 Nairobi 
 Ongata Rongai
 Ngong
 Mai Mahiu
 Suswa

LAPSSET
 Lamu - port
 Ijara
 Garissa
 Isiolo - junction
 Lodwar
 Nakodok
   Kenya-Ethiopia border
 Isiolo - junction
 Marsabit
 Moyale
   Kenya-South Sudan border
 Nairobi - junction
 Embu
 Isiolo - junction

Picture gallery

See also 

 Transport in Kenya
 Rail transport in Kenya
 Railway stations in Uganda
 Railway stations in Tanzania
 Railway stations in Rwanda
 Railway stations in Burundi
 Railway stations in South Sudan
 Lamu Port and Lamu-Southern Sudan-Ethiopia Transport Corridor

References 

 Nairobi & Environs map, scale 1:100,000. 3rd edition, Survey of Kenya, 1978
 The Rough Guide Map - Kenya. Scale 1:950,000.
 Satelliteviews.net

External links 

 
Railway stations
Railway stations